Terebra fernandesi is a species of sea snail, a marine gastropod mollusc in the family Terebridae, the auger snails.

Distribution
This marine species occurs off Angola.

References

 Bouchet P. (1983 (1982") Les Terebridae (Mollusca, Gastropoda) de l'Atlantique oriental. Bollettino Malacologico 18: 185-216
 Bratcher T. & Cernohorsky W.O. (1987). Living terebras of the world. A monograph of the recent Terebridae of the world. American Malacologists, Melbourne, Florida & Burlington, Massachusetts. 240pp.
 Terryn Y. & Ryall P. (2014) West African Terebridae, with the description of a new species from the Cape Verde Islands. Conchylia 44(3-4): 27–47.
 Bratcher T. & Cernohorsky W.O. (1987). Living terebras of the world. A monograph of the recent Terebridae of the world. American Malacologists, Melbourne, Florida & Burlington, Massachusetts. 240pp

External links
 Fedosov, A. E.; Malcolm, G.; Terryn, Y.; Gorson, J.; Modica, M. V.; Holford, M.; Puillandre, N. (2020). Phylogenetic classification of the family Terebridae (Neogastropoda: Conoidea). Journal of Molluscan Studies. 85(4): 359-388

Terebridae
Gastropods described in 1983